The Lonnie B. Harris Black Cultural Center is a cultural center located at Oregon State University.

History 
Three years after the creation of the Office of Minority Affairs in 1970, the Oregon State University's Black Student Union opened a Black Student Union Cultural Center that was later renamed the Lonnie B. Harris Cultural Center in 1999. 

The Black Student Union was threatening to leave OSU after repeated discrimination and so action was needed. The university opened several cultural centers around this time including the Native American Longhouse in 1971 and the Hispanic Cultural Center in 1976.

The center opened on April 26th, 1975. In 1976, a cross was burned in front of the center. Upon questioning, the culprits said that the action was a "prank which got out of hand." While this action was undoubtedly one with deep historical roots associated with white supremacy, African American campus leaders met with the culprit and asked for leniency regarding his punishment."

Lonnie B. Harris 
Lonnie B. Harris was the first director of the Educational Opportunities Program who sought to help "increase the recruitment and retention of black students at OSU."

Oregon State University Black Student Union 
After an Oregon State University football player was kicked off the team in 1969 for refusing to shave his afro and sideburns, the Black students on campus were irate. 47 Black students staged a walkout immediately resulting in various talks that led to the formation of the Black Student Union.

Architecture 
The Lonnie B. Harris Black Cultural Center was temporarily moved to Snell Hall as a new location was being rebuilt in 2013.

Location 
100 SW Memorial Place
Corvallis, OR 97331

References

External links
Lonnie B. Harris Black Cultural Center Website
Oregon State University buildings
Cultural centers in the United States
African-American cultural history
African-American history of Oregon